The Alexis de Tocqueville Tour was a series of programs produced by C-SPAN in 1997 and 1998 that followed the path taken by Alexis de Tocqueville and Gustave de Beaumont through the United States during their 1831–32 visit. It explored many of the themes that Tocqueville discussed in Democracy in America, the two-volume work that he wrote based on his American travels. A C-SPAN School Bus traveled to each of the stops made by Tocqueville and Beaumont. Many of the Tocqueville programs were segments of C-SPAN's morning news and call-in show, Washington Journal, and they were timed to coincide with the anniversaries of Tocqueville and Beaumont's visits to those places. Typically, they were about 30 minutes long, and incorporated calls, e-mails, and faxes from viewers.

Professor John Splaine of the University of Maryland, College Park consulted on the series, and six other historians and academics served as advisors: Peter Lawler of Berry College; Daniel Mahoney of Assumption College; Harvey Mansfield of Harvard University; Ken Masugi of the United States Air Force Academy; Jim Schleifer of the College of New Rochelle; and Delba Winthrop of Harvard University.

Background
C-SPAN CEO Brian Lamb described the basis for the Tocqueville project as follows:

"Out of that experience [the 1994 reenactments of the Lincoln-Douglas Debates] and Booknotes, this small town Midwesterner [referring to himself] came again to the constant reference to Alexis de Tocqueville. Time and time again, left and right, Democrat and Republican, all the politicians would quote Alexis de Tocqueville—often incorrectly. It was amazing to me when I found out. There's a famous quote attributed to Tocqueville: "America is great because America is good. If America ever stops being good, it will stop being great." He just never said it. Presidents, President Clinton, former Speaker Gingrich, and lots of other politicians have constantly repeated that quote, and it's not true. So that was one of the small offshoots that we learned by going around the United States, stopping in 55 communities. We started, by the way, at his chateau in Normandy, France, where we did a four-hour live program on Saturday morning in May of 1995."

Tour programs
Note: Prof. John Splaine of the University of Maryland, College Park appeared as a commentator in numerous Tocqueville programs. Various local historians, journalists, and citizens also appeared as interviewees.

References

External links
Official site for "Retracing the steps of Alexis de Tocqueville's 1831 journey"
Booknotes interview with Alan Ryan on the Introduction to Alexis de Tocqueville's Democracy in America, February 26, 1995.
Booknotes interview with Harvey Mansfield on the University of Chicago Press edition of Democracy in America, December 17, 2000
Phone interviews with winners of C-SPAN's Tocqueville contest, February 6, 1998
In-studio interviews with winners of C-SPAN's Tocqueville contest, February 23, 1998

C-SPAN original programming
1997 American television series debuts
1998 American television series endings
American television talk shows